Psychedelic soul (originally called black rock or conflated with psychedelic funk) is a music genre that emerged in the late 1960s and saw Black soul musicians embrace elements of psychedelic rock, including its production techniques, instrumentation, effects units (wah-wah pedal, phaser, etc.) and drug influences. It came to prominence in the late 1960s and continued into the 1970s, playing a major role in the development of funk and disco.

Pioneering acts working in the genre included Sly and the Family Stone, Jimi Hendrix, Isaac Hayes, the Temptations, the Chambers Brothers and George Clinton's Parliament-Funkadelic ensemble.

History

Origins

Following the lead of Jimi Hendrix in psychedelic rock, in the late 1960s psychedelia began to have a widespread impact on Afro American musicians, particularly the stars of the Motown label. Influenced by the civil rights movement, it had a darker and more political edge than much psychedelic rock. Building on the funk sound of James Brown, it was pioneered by Sly and the Family Stone with songs like "Dance to the Music" (1968), "Everyday People" (1968) and "I Want to Take You Higher" (1969), which had a sound that emphasized distorted electric rhythm guitar and strong basslines. Also important were the Temptations and their producer Norman Whitfield, who moved from a relatively light vocal group into more hard-edged and topical material like "Cloud Nine" (1968), "Runaway Child, Running Wild" (1969), and "Psychedelic Shack" (1969).

Development
Other Motown acts soon followed into psychedelic territory, including established performers like the Supremes with "Reflections" (1967), "Love Child" (1968), and "Stoned Love" (1970). Psychedelic influences could also be heard in the work of Stevie Wonder and in Marvin Gaye's socially conscious work from What's Going On (1971). Acts that broke through with psychedelic soul included the Chambers Brothers with "Time Has Come Today" (1966, but charting in 1968), Arthur Brown with "Fire" (1968), the 5th Dimension with a cover of Laura Nyro's "Stoned Soul Picnic" (1968), Edwin Starr's "War" (1970) and the Undisputed Truth's "Smiling Faces Sometimes" (1971).

George Clinton's interdependent Funkadelic and Parliament ensembles and their various spin-offs, taking influence from Detroit rock groups including MC5 and The Stooges, used extended distorted guitar solos and psychedelic sound effects, coupled with surreal imagery and stage antics, especially on early Funkadelic albums such as Funkadelic (1970), Free Your Mind... and Your Ass Will Follow (1970), and Maggot Brain (1971); and Parliament album Osmium (1970), producing more than forty singles, including three in the US top ten, and three platinum albums. Shuggie Otis's 1974 album Inspiration Information was a psychedelic soul record that emerged too late to take advantage of the style's popularity, but later found acclaim when it was reissued in 2001.

Decline and influence
While psychedelic rock began to waver at the end of the 1960s, psychedelic soul continued into the 1970s, peaking in popularity in the early years of the decade, and only disappearing in the late 1970s as tastes began to change. Isaac Hayes and Curtis Mayfield added orchestral instrumentation, creating cinematic soul, which ultimately led to disco. Acts like Earth, Wind & Fire, Kool & the Gang, and Ohio Players, who began as psychedelic soul artists, incorporated its sounds into funk music and eventually the disco which partly replaced it.

Modern artists
Modern psychedelic soul artists include Erykah Badu, Bilal, Black Pumas, Janelle Monáe, and Adrian Younge. On Kali Uchis´s music Pitchfork noted that "Watching her loungey psychedelic spirit evolve into confident, shapeshifting pop has been fascinating; a generation of fans have fallen under the spell of her experimental nostalgia music"

See also
:Category:Psychedelic soul songs
Psychedelic pop
Neo-psychedelia
Black Rock Coalition
Afro-punk

References

 
Soul music genres
Psychedelic music